National Tertiary Route 812, or just Route 812 (or ) is a National Road Route of Costa Rica, located in the Limón province.

Description
In Limón province the route covers Siquirres canton (Germania, Cairo districts).

References

Highways in Costa Rica